House Calls is an American sitcom that lasted three seasons and 57 episodes, from December 17, 1979 to September 6, 1982, on CBS television, produced by Universal Television and based upon the 1978 feature film of the same name.

Synopsis
British-born Ann Atkinson (Lynn Redgrave), as hospital administrator, had three unruly doctors to cope with, and the comedy arose from their interactions. Dr. Charley Michaels (Wayne Rogers) became the main problem for her, because of the romantic angle. She always pulled herself up short just before falling hopelessly in love with him. Dr. Solomon (Ray Buktenica) was junior to Dr. Michaels and was his pal, and he would counterbalance Dr. Michaels's headstrong ways, almost a double act. But elderly Dr. Weatherby (David Wayne) was senior to them all, close to retirement and with a mean streak, which meant that the others were often taking a rise out of the old fellow. The best he could do was to irritate Solomon by constantly getting his name wrong while going his own way.

Other characters who were part of the series were Head Nurse Bradley (Aneta Corsaut), a sympathetic and level-headed influence, Mrs. Phipps (Deedy Peters), a somewhat over-the-hill but enthusiastic candystriper, always forcing her good intentions upon unwilling patients, and Conrad Peckler (Mark L. Taylor), who was brought in as the arch villain of the piece to bring order to the hospital, hated by all.

During the last 13 episodes, after Ann had suddenly returned to England, her replacement was Jane Jeffries (Sharon Gless), who had a similar love/hate relationship with Dr. Michaels.

Controversy and cancellation
Lynn Redgrave was fired from the series, following the birth of her new child. She insisted on bringing her daughter to work, in part, because she wanted to be able to breast-feed the baby on schedule, but this was interpreted by the studio as holding out for more money, while being disruptive to shooting requirements. Redgrave sued Universal for breaking her existing contract, but never was rehired, and the suit was dismissed several years later. (The breast-feeding controversy was later spoofed on Second City Television  in a sketch titled "Wet Nurse", with Andrea Martin playing Redgrave as a nurse with gigantic breasts solving several crises at a hospital) 

Universal replaced Redgrave with Sharon Gless, who was then under a 10-year contract with Universal, but previously excellent ratings suffered from the abrupt and clumsily-handled transition (Ann announced her departure in a letter read out loud by Charlie), and the series was ultimately cancelled by early 1982, despite still finishing the season in the Top 25.

Episodes

Awards and nominations
Redgrave was nominated for an Emmy for Outstanding Lead Actress in a Comedy Series in 1981, and she and Wayne Rogers were also nominated for  Golden Globes.

External links

Press Announces Suit
John Clark: The Redgrave Controversy

1979 American television series debuts
1982 American television series endings
1970s American sitcoms
1980s American sitcoms
1970s American medical television series
1980s American medical television series
1970s American workplace comedy television series
1980s American workplace comedy television series
CBS original programming
English-language television shows
Live action television shows based on films
Television series by Universal Television
Television shows set in San Francisco